Reminiscence (stylized as reminiscence) is the first extended play by South Korean girl group Everglow under Yuehua Entertainment. The EP was released on February 3, 2020, together with its lead single, "Dun Dun".

Background
On January 20, 2020, Yuehua Entertainment revealed that Everglow will release their very first mini-album titled Reminiscence.

Concept images were released between January 22–24. The tracklist was released on January 25, revealing four tracks: "Salute", lead single "Dun Dun", "Player" and "No Lie".

The music video teaser for "Dun Dun" was released on January 29, and the full music video on February 3.

Promotion
Everglow was supposed to hold a live fan showcase on February 3 but it was canceled for the public because of coronavirus prevention concerns. They held the showcase without audience where they performed "Dun Dun" and "Salute".

The group began promoting "Dun Dun" on February 6. They first performed the lead single on Mnet's M Countdown together with "Salute", followed by performances on KBS' Music Bank, MBC's Show! Music Core and SBS' Inkigayo.

After their tour in the U.S., they returned with a final round of promotions performing "No Lie" and "Player".

Track listing

Charts

Release history

See also
List of 2020 albums

References

2020 debut EPs
Everglow albums
Korean-language EPs